Ride a Violent Mile is a 1957 American Western film directed by Charles Marquis Warren and written by Eric Norden. The film stars John Agar, Penny Edwards, John Pickard, Bing Russell, Richard Shannon and Charles H. Gray. The film was released on November 24, 1957, by 20th Century Fox.

Plot

A stranger in town, Jeff Donner, intervenes when dancehall girl Susan Crowley is accosted by two men. He then discovers a man's mortally wounded body, listens to his last words, then is arrested for murder by Thorne, the new marshal.

Susan helps him get away and confides to Donner that she is actually a Union Army undercover operative. She says the dead man was to deliver a coded message to her, but was killed while she was being roughed up by the two cowboys. Donner repeats what the man said, which Susan is to pass along to a Cavalry officer. A man named Norman murders the officer and pretends to be him, then takes Susan captive.

Donner, discovering that the man's coded message involves a Confederate plot to rustle cattle and seize advantageous land, confronts Thorne, who's in league with the rebels. He is successful and rescues Susan as well.

Cast 
John Agar as Jeff Donner
Penny Edwards as Susan Crowley
John Pickard as Marshal James Thorne
Bing Russell as Corporal Norman
Richard Shannon as Sam
Charles H. Gray as Dory 
Sheb Wooley as Jonathan Long
Rush Williams as Edwards
Richard Gilden as Francisco Gomez
Rocky Shahan as Outlaw

Production
The film was produced by Charles Marquess Warren's Emirau Productions.

Filming started in June 1957.

References

External links 
 

1957 films
20th Century Fox films
American Western (genre) films
1957 Western (genre) films
Films directed by Charles Marquis Warren
Films scored by Raoul Kraushaar
1950s English-language films
1950s American films